The Friden Flexowriter produced by the Friden Calculating Machine Company, was a teleprinter, a heavy-duty electric typewriter capable of being driven not only by a human typing, but also automatically by several methods, including direct attachment to a computer and by use of paper tape.

Elements of the design date to the 1920s, and variants of the machine were produced until the early 1970s; the machines found a variety of uses during the evolution of office equipment in the 20th century, including being among the first electric typewriters, computer input and output devices, forerunners of modern word processing, and also having roles in the machine tool and printing industries.

History

Origins and early history
The Flexowriter can trace its roots to some of the earliest electric typewriters.  In 1925, the Remington Typewriter Company wanted to expand their offerings to include electric typewriters. Having little expertise or manufacturing ability with electrical appliances, they partnered with Northeast Electric Company of Rochester and made a production run of 2500 electric typewriters. When the time came to make more units, Remington was suffering a management vacuum and could not complete contract negotiations, so Northeast began work on their own electric typewriter. In 1929, they started selling the Electromatic.

In 1931, Northeast was bought by Delco. Delco had no interest in a typewriter product line, so they spun the product off as a separate company called Electromatic. Around this time, Electromatic built a prototype automatic typewriter. This device used a wide roll of paper, similar to a player piano roll. For each key on the typewriter, there was a column on the roll of paper. If the key was to be pressed, then a hole was punched in the column for that key.

The Electromatic typewriter patents document the use of pivoted spiral cams operating against a hard rubber drive roller to drive the print mechanism.  This was the foundation of essentially all later electric typewriters.  The typewriter could be equipped with a "remote control" mechanism allowing one typewriter to control another or to record and play back typed data through a parallel data connection with one wire per typewriter key.  The Electromatic tape perforator used a wide tape, with punch position per key on the keyboard.

In 1932, a code for the paper tape used to drive Linotype and other typesetting machines was standardized. This allowed use of a tape only five to seven holes wide to drive automatic typewriters, teleprinters and similar equipment.

In 1933, IBM wanted to enter the electric typewriter market, and purchased the Electromatic Corporation, renaming the typewriter the IBM Model 01, and continuing to use the Electromatic trademark.

IBM experimented with several accessories and enhancements for its electric typewriter.  In 1942, IBM filed a patent application for a typewriter that could print justified and proportionally spaced text.  This required recording each line of text on a paper tape before it was printed.  IBM experimented with a 12-hole paper tape compatible with their punched-card code.
Eventually, IBM settled on a six-hole encoding, as documented in their automatic justifying typewriter patents filed in 1945.  Equipping an electric typewriter with both a paper-tape reader and punch created the basic foundation for what would become the Flexowriter.

By the late 1930s, IBM had a nearly complete monopoly on unit record equipment and related punched card machinery, and expanding the product line into automatic typewriters equipped with paper tape raised antitrust issues. As a result, IBM sold the product line and factory to the Commercial Controls Corporation (CCC) of Rochester, New York, which also absorbed the National Postal Meter Corporation. CCC was formed by several former IBM employees.

World War II
Around the time of World War II, CCC developed a proportional spacing model of the Flexowriter known as The Presidential (or sometimes the President). The model name was derived from the fact that these units were used to generate the White House letters informing families of the deaths of service personnel in the war. CCC also manufactured other complex mechanical devices for the war effort, including M1 carbines.

In 1944, the pioneering Harvard Mark I computer was constructed, using an Electromatic for output.

Postwar
In 1950, Edwin O. Blodgett filed a patent application on behalf of Commercial Controls Corporation for a "tape controlled typewriter."  This machine used a six-level punched paper tape, and was the basis for the machines CCC and Friden built over the next 15 years.  This improved machine was contemporaneous with the first generation of commercial computers.  Applications for Flexowriters exploded in the 1950s, covering territory in commercial printing, machine tools, computers, and many forms of office automation. This versatility was helped by Friden's willingness to engineer and build many different configurations. In the late 1950s, CCC was purchased by Friden, a maker of electromechanical calculators, and it was under their name that the machines achieved their greatest diversity and success; applications are further detailed below.

Two tape stations allowed implementation of what was then called the form letter, the combination of standard text (one tape) with varying name and address information (the other tape).

End of product line

Edwin Blodgett, Chief Engineer of Friden R&D, was replaced in 1964 while ill. It is unclear what effect this had on development, especially as Blodgett was apparently biased against electronics, favoring electromechanical solutions to design problems.

Friden was acquired by the Singer Corporation in 1965. Singer had little or no understanding of the computer industry, and there was a clash of corporate culture with Friden employees.

There was a major redesign of the Flexowriter in the mid 1960s.  The Model 2201 Programatic, introduced in 1965, had a sleek modern styling and 13 programmable function keys.  This was the first major change in appearance of Flexowriters in nearly forty years.  Programming was done using a 320-contact plugboard, and all of the logic was implemented using relays.  The case, although modern looking, was entirely metal, giving the machine a shipping weight of 132 pounds (60 kg).  The selling price was £2900 (British pounds).  

Although primarily sold as a stand-alone word processor (a term not yet in use at the time), Friden also sold it with a communications option allowing it to be used as a computer terminal.  Members of the 2200 family operated at 135 words per minute (11.3 characters per second).  The family also included the 2210 and 2211, on which the function keys were replaced with a numeric keypad, and the 2261, using ASCII instead of the proprietary eight-bit code used by other members of the 2200 family.

The 2300 series were cosmetically similar to the 2200 series, although without the function keys or numeric keypad, with a simplified plugboard, and operating at 145 words per minute (12 characters per second).  In addition to the basic 2301, the 2302 supported the auxiliary tape readers and punches from the 2200 family.  The 2304 offered proportional spacing and a carbon ribbon mechanism, making it suitable for preparing camera-ready copy.  The base price for the 2300 family was £1400 (British pounds).  This would be the last hurrah for the line, with production halting in the early 1970s.

Sales and innovation declined.  In the late 1960s, the market for word processing equipment was shifting to magnetic media.  IBM introduced the Magnetic Tape Selectric Typewriter (MT/ST) in 1964.  In October, 1968, Information Control Systems introduced the Astrotype word processing system.  Both of these used magnetic tape and Selectric print mechanisms.  With its fixed type font and paper-tape recording medium, the Flexowriter had difficulty competing with these machines, although some Flexowriter documentation emphasized the fact that, unlike IBM's MT/ST tapes, Flexowriter users could cut and splice paper tapes, particularly if they could recognize some of the common codes such as carriage return.  

The Diablo daisy wheel printer, introduced in 1969, offered comparable print quality at twice the speed.  Larger manufacturers such as IBM and DEC made their own console equipment, and video terminals began to appear, displacing paper-based systems.  Eventually, even the CNC machine tool industry abandoned paper tape, although this was significantly slower because of the long working life of machine tools.

Applications

Automatic typewriters

From its earliest days through to at least the mid-1960s, Flexowriters were used as automatic letter writers.

While the US White House was using them during the Second World War, in the 1960s, United States Members of Congress used Flexowriters extensively to handle enormous volumes of routine correspondence with constituents; an advantage of this method was that these letters appeared to have been individually typed by hand. These were complemented by autopen machines which could use a pen to place a signature on letters making them appear to have been hand-signed.

Auxiliary paper-tape readers could be attached to a Flexowriter to create an early form of "mail merge", where a long custom-created tape containing individual addresses and salutations was merged with a closed-loop form-letter and printed on continuous-form letterhead; both tapes contained embedded "control characters" to switch between readers.

Console terminals
As the unit record equipment (tabulating machine) industry matured and became the computer industry, Flexowriters were commonly used as console terminals for computers. Because ASCII character coding had not yet been standardized, each type of computer tended to use its own system for encoding characters; Flexowriters were capable of being configured with numerous encodings particular to the computer system the machine was being used with.

Computers that used Flexowriters as consoles include:
 The Electromatic on the Harvard Mark I
 The MIT Whirlwind I computer, first designed to control a flight simulator, and later becoming the basis of the SAGE network.
 The Lincoln Laboratory TX-0, an early experimental transistor-based minicomputer, which was to be a seminal influence on hacker culture at MIT in the late 1950s prior to the introduction of the PDP-1.
 The BMEWS DIP computer, NORAD Combat Operations Center (COC), Colorado Springs, Colo., beginning in 1960. Tape code was essentially base-32.
Electrodata 205. ElectroData was purchased by the Burroughs Corporation, and many later Burroughs machines also used Flexowriters
 The Librascope LGP-30 and LGP-21
 The Packard Bell PB 250
 The SEA CAB 500
 The ALWAC III-E
 The English Electric KDF9.

The Whirlwind I deployment in 1955 is notable as it seems to have been the first time that a typewriter-like input device was directly connected to a general-purpose electronic computer, becoming directly ancestral to today's computer keyboards.

Offline punch and printer
Flexowriters could also be used as offline punches and printers. Programmers would type their programs on Flexowriters, which would punch the program onto paper tape. The tapes could then be loaded into computers to run the programs. Computers could then use their own punches to make paper tapes that could be used by the Flexowriters to print output. Among the computers which commonly used Flexowriters for this task was the DEC PDP-1.

Machine tools
The ability to support diverse encodings meant that adapting Flexowriters to generate the paper tapes used to drive CNC machine tool equipment was a relatively simple affair, and many Flexowriters found homes in machine shops into the 1970s, when magnetic media displaced paper tape in the industry.

Unit record and early computing
Friden manufactured equipment which could connect their calculators to Flexowriters, printing output and performing unit record tasks such as form letters for bills, and eventually manufactured their own computers to further enhance these capabilities. These variants were sold as the Friden Computyper. Computypers were electromechanical; they had no electronics, at least in their earlier models. The calculator mechanism, inside a desk-like enclosure, was much like a Friden model STW desktop calculator, except that it had electrical input (via solenoids) and output (low-torque rotary switches on the dial shafts) .

Commercial printing

A product known as the Justowriter (or Just-O-Writer) was developed for the printing industry. It allowed typists to produce justified text for use in typesetting. This worked by having the user type the document on a Recording unit, which placed extra codes for spacing on the paper tape. The tape was placed into a second specially adapted Flexowriter which had two paper tape reading heads; one would read the text while the other controlled the spacing of the print. Spacing codes were stored in relays inside the machine as a line of text progressed. At least some Justowriters used carbon (as opposed to ink-impregnated fabric) ribbons to produce cleaner type, suitable for mass photo-set reproduction, sometimes referred to as cold type composition.

The Line Casting Control or LCC product generated paper tapes for Linotype and Intertype automatic typesetters. In addition to punching a tape containing the text to be typeset, it turned on a lamp easily seen by the operator to show that the text on the line being typed could be typeset—it was within justifiable range. The LCC had a four-wheel rotary escapement, and a set of gears between the carriage rack and the escapement, to permit the smallest unit of spacing at the escapement to be quite small at the carriage. The spring-tensioned tape that moved the carriage had far more tension (possibly 20 lbs?) than did a standard Flexowriter.

American Type Founders produced a phototypesetter based on the Justowriter/Flexowriter platform.

Finance
There was an "accounting" model with an ultra-wide carriage and two-color ribbon for printing out wide financial reports. The Friden accounting model was called "5010 COMPUTYPER" and was capable of arithmetic functions (addition, subtraction, multiplication & division) at electronic speeds and to print the results automatically in a useful document.

Hardware

As a cutting edge device of their time, Flexowriters, especially some of the specialized types like typesetters, were quite costly. They were made for extreme durability. There were porous sintered bronze bearings, many hardened steel parts, very strong springs, and a substantial AC motor to move all the parts. Most parts are made of heavy gauge steel. The housing and most removable covers were heavy die castings. While the final Singer models did make some use of plastics, even they were quite heavy compared to other electric typewriters of their time.  

If used only as manual typewriters, and properly maintained, Flexowriters might last a century. When reproducing form letters from punched tape, the considerable speed and loud sound of the device made watching it a somewhat frightening experience.

Towards the bottom of the unit there was a large rubber roller ("power roll") that rotated continuously at a few hundred rpm. It provided power for typing as well as power-operated backspace, type basket shift, and power for engaging (and probably disengaging) the carriage return clutch.

Referring to the photo of the cam assembly (often simply called a cam; it was not meant to be disassembled), the holes in the side plates at the lower left were for the assembly's pivot rod, which was fixed to the frame. At the extreme upper left was part of a disconnectable pivot that pulled down on the typing linkage. As installed, "down" was to the right in the photo.

Referring again to the part at the upper left, the mating part had a threaded mounting for adjusting cam clearance from the power roll. The irregular "roundish" part, lower right center, was the cam itself. It rotated in the frame while in contact with the power roll. The surface of the cam in contact with the power roll had grooves for better grip. As the radius at the contact patch increased, the frame rotated clockwise to pull down on the linkage to type the character.

This particular cam assembly had a cam that rotated a full turn for each operation; it might operate the backspace, basket shift, or carriage-return clutch disengage mechanism. Cams for typing characters rotated only half a turn, the halves being identical.

Below the cam in this photo (hidden) was a spring-loaded lever that pushed against a pin on the cam. On the upper edge of the cam, as shown, was a little projection that engaged the release lever, which was at the lowest part of the image; this was an irregular shape.

When a key was pressed down, it moved the release lever and unlatched the cam for that letter; the spring-loaded lever pressing on the pin rotated the cam until it engaged the power roll. As the cam continued to turn, increasing radius rotated the cam's frame slightly (clockwise in the photo) to operate the typing linkage for that character.

As the cam continued to rotate, the spring-loaded lever pushed on the pin to move it toward home position, but if the key were still down, the cam (now out of contact with the power roll) stalled because the projection on the cam would catch on another part of the release lever. The cam stalled until the key was released. When released, the lever would catch the projection so the cam was now in home position. This resembled a simple clock escapement, and prevented repeated typing. (The "key-down" anti-repeat stop could be removed, so that fast repetitive typing could be done, but this change was difficult to undo.)

Carriage return was done by a non-stretch very durable textile tape attached to the platen advance mechanism at the left of the carriage. For a return, the tape wound up on a small reel operated from the drive system through a clutch. A cam engaged the clutch; it was disengaged by the left margin stop, perhaps directly, perhaps via another cam.  A light-torque spring kept the return tape wound on the reel.

The basic mechanism looked just like an IBM electric typewriter from the late 1940s. In fact, some Flexowriter parts were identical in fit and function to the early IBM electric typewriters (those with rotary carriage escapements, a gear-driven power roll, and a governor-controlled variable speed "universal" (wound-rotor/commutator) motor).

The early IBM rotary-escapement proportional-spacing typewriters (three wheel rotary escapement, spur gear differentials) had code bars to control the amount of carriage movement for the current character. They were operated by the cams. However, the Flexowriter's mechanical encoder was a very different and far more rugged design, although still operated by the cams.

Flexowriters (at least those prior to 1969) do not have transistors; electrical control operations were done with telephone-style (E-Class) relays, and troubleshooting often involved problems with the timing on the relays. Another reader has also found that the timing settings of the various leaf switches (such as in the tape reader) are also important.

The screws used in the Flexowriter were unique, having large flat heads with a very narrow screwdriver slot and a unique thread size and pitch. This may have been a conscious decision. Another reader found that standard 4-40UNC threads appear to fit some of the cover-attachments; internally, the headless set-screws require fluted Bristol keys, which were not commonly available in Great Britain.

There was a holder for a large roll of paper tape on the back of the unit, with tape feeding around to a punch on the left side, toward the rear. The tape reader was on the same side, toward the front, and was essentially identical to the reader shown on the front of the square housing in the photo of the auxiliary reader. The right side of a Flexowriter had a large (~1") connector for hooking the unit up to computers and other equipment. Depending on the model, this connector might be wired in many different ways.

At various times and in various configurations, "Flexos" came with 5-, 6-, 7-, or 8-channel paper tape reader/punches, could have several auxiliary paper tape units attached, and could also attach to IBM punched card equipment.

See also
 Expensive Typewriter
 TECO
 PDP-1

References

External links

Friden Flexowriter: a part of Manuals at bitsavers.org
Photos and history Retrieved April 10, 2007
Discussion of Flexowriter code conversion with link to code chart
Flexowriter patent
Firearms code markings, including note of CCC produced M-1s.
Description of Justowriter Also  discusses Blodgett
Video of a Flexowriter SPD typing from a punched tape
Computer museum @ hack42.nl

Typewriters
Word processors
Computer terminals